The 2011 World Snooker Championship (officially the 2011 Betfred.com World Snooker Championship) was a professional snooker tournament that took place between 16 April and 2 May 2011 at the Crucible Theatre in Sheffield, England. It was the 35th consecutive year that the World Snooker Championship had been held at the Crucible and was the last ranking event of the 2010–11 snooker season. The event was organised by the World Professional Billiards and Snooker Association and had a total prize fund of £1,111,000, with £250,000 going to the winner of the event.  The tournament was sponsored by sports betting company Betfred.

Neil Robertson was the defending champion, but lost 8–10 against Judd Trump in the first round. Trump became the youngest player since 1990 to reach the final where he lost to John Higgins. This was Higgins' fourth world title, becoming only the fourth man to win four or more championships in the modern era. Ding Junhui meanwhile became the first player from China to reach the semi-finals. Mark King and Ding Junhui made the highest breaks at the Crucible with 138; while James Wattana compiled the highest break of the tournament during qualifying with 141.

An audience of 3.93 million viewers watched the fourth session in Great Britain with 2.03 million watching the third session of the final. The second and fourth sessions of the final were the most watched programmes on BBC Two for their particular weeks. Viewing figures on the BBC peaked at 6.6 million viewers. The figure of 3.9 million who watched the final session was up 50% on the year before. It was estimated that nearly half of the UK population watched the tournament at some point. In China, Ding Junhui's semi-final had an average watch of 19.4 million with a peak audience of 30 million over seven television networks. A record number of fans bought tickets, with the last four days and other sessions sold out with sales up 15% on 2010.

Overview
The World Snooker Championship is an annual cue sport tournament and the official world championship of the game of snooker. Invented in the late 19th century by British Army soldiers stationed in India, the sport was popular in Great Britain. In modern times it has been played worldwide, especially in East and Southeast Asian nations such as China, Hong Kong and Thailand.

In the 2011 tournament, 32 professional players competed in one-on-one snooker matches played over several , using a single-elimination tournament format. The 32 players were selected for the event using the snooker world rankings and a pre-tournament qualification competition. In 1927, the first world championship was won by Joe Davis. The event's final took place in Camkin's Hall, Birmingham, England. Since 1977, the event has been held at the Crucible Theatre in Sheffield, England. The event was organised by the World Professional Billiards and Snooker Association. Australian Neil Robertson was the defending champion, having defeated Graeme Dott 18–13 in the previous year's final. The event was sponsored by sports betting company Betfred.

Format
The 2011 World Snooker Championship took place from 16 April to 2 May 2011 in Sheffield, England. The tournament was the last of eight ranking events in the 2010–11 snooker season on the World Snooker Tour. It featured a 32-player main draw that was held at the Crucible Theatre, as well as a qualifying draw that was played at the World Snooker Academy in Sheffield from 3 to 13 March. This was the 35th consecutive year that the tournament had been staged at the Crucible. The main stages of the event were broadcast by the BBC in the United Kingdom.

The top 16 players in the latest world rankings automatically qualified for the main draw as seeded players. Robertson was seeded first overall as the defending champion, and the remaining 15 seeds were allocated based on the latest world rankings. The number of frames required to win a match increased throughout the tournament. The first round consisted of best-of-19-frames matches, with the final match being played over a maximum of 35 frames. All 16 non-seeded spots in the main draw were filled with players from the qualifying rounds.

Prize fund
For the 2011 tournament there was a £1,111,000 prize fund with the winner receiving £250,000. World Snooker offered no additional prize money for a maximum break, whereas in previous years the prize money for this achievement was £147,000. The breakdown of prize money for this year is shown below:

Winner: £250,000
Runner-up: £125,000
Semi-final: £52,000
Quarter-final: £24,050
Last 16: £16,000
Last 32: £12,000
Last 48: £8,200
Last 64: £4,600
Stage one highest break: £1,000
Stage two highest break: £10,000
Total: £1,111,000

Tournament summary

Opening rounds (first round—quarter-finals)

The first round was played from 16 to 21 April as the best of 19 frames held over two . Defending champion Neil Robertson led Judd Trump 7–6, but lost the match 8–10. Trump, having recently won the 2011 China Open, commented "I'm on a high at the moment and I don't want it to finish. I want to make winning a habit". There were two debutants at the main stages of the event: Andrew Pagett and Jimmy Robertson. This was also the first time that either had qualified for the main draw of a ranking tournament. Both players lost their opening round match, as Pagett lost 7–10 against Jamie Cope and Jimmy Robertson lost 1–10 against Mark Selby.

Both Barry Hawkins and Rory McLeod reached the second round of the World Championship for the first time. Hawkins defeated Stephen Maguire on a  10–9 and McLeod defeated Ricky Walden 10–6. Ronnie O'Sullivan attempted to withdraw from the event one week before it started, but later, when asked for a written confirmation, changed his decision. He compiled his 100th century break at the venue in his first round match against Dominic Dale, as he won 10–2. Previous winner Graeme Dott led Mark King 7–3, but was reduced to a 7–6 lead. Dott won three of the next four frames to complete a 10–7 victory. Seven-time winner Hendry defeated Joe Perry 10–9 on a deciding frame, but hinted that he might retire after the event. In total, five out of the sixteen seeded players lost their first round matches: Neil Robertson, Maguire, Walden, Marco Fu and Peter Ebdon. Fu lost 8–10 against Martin Gould and Ebdon lost 8–10 against Stuart Bingham.

The second round was played as the best of 25 frames, held over three sessions. Selby made six century breaks during his 13–4 victory over Hendry. This was the first time six century breaks had been made in a match at the event, and also for a best of 25 frames match at any event. Trump defeated Gould 13–6, with his opponent considering him to be a favourite to win the event, and Trump commenting "I feel I've got the game to go out and win it". Dott and Carter were tied at 11–11 in their second round match, before Dott won the next two frames to complete a 13–11 victory. Ding came back from 9–12 to defeat Stuart Bingham on a deciding frame. This was the first time that he had qualified for the quarter-finals of the world championships. Eleventh seed Mark Allen also went to a deciding frame, as he defeated Hawkins 13–12. In a long eight-hour match, John Higgins overcame Rory McLeod 13–7.

The quarter-finals were played as the best of 25 frames. Mark Williams defeated Allen 13–5 to reach the semi-finals of the World Championship for the first time since winning the 2003 World Snooker Championship. Trump, rated an 80–1 outsider at the beginning of the tournament, defeated previous year's runner up Dott 13–5 to reach the semi-finals. Ding won his match 13–10 against Selby to become the third Asian player to reach the semi-finals of the world championship, following James Wattana and Fu. As a result of Selby's exit, Williams became the new world number one after the event. O'Sullivan led Higgins 8–5 in their quarter-final match, but won just two of the next ten frames, as Higgins won the match 13–10. O'Sullivan commented "I had enough chances to win, more than I expected. I just didn't take them", whilst Higgins suggested that O'Sullivan missing was the only way he could have won the match.

Later rounds (semi-finals—final)
The semi-finals were played as the best of 33 frames, held over four sessions. Trump defeated Ding 17–15 to become the second youngest player (after Hendry in 1990) to reach the final of the event. Trump also reached his second consecutive ranking final after winning the China Open at the start of the month. In China, the second session of the match drew a peak audience of nearly 30 million viewers and averaging over 19 million, with the World Professional Billiards and Snooker Association claiming it was the highest rated sports programme of 2011 up to that point; however, the Women's Tennis Association claimed that the women's singles final of the Australian Open held earlier in the year drew an audience of 60 million viewers on Chinese television. Williams led Higgins 5–3 after the first session, and maintained his lead after the second session, which ended 9–7. Higgins, however, then won six of the next eight frames, to lead 13–11 after the third session. Higgins won the match 17–14 to reach his third final in five years. During the 28th frame Higgins was heckled by a member of the audience, "How did you swallow that £300,000, John? ... You're a disgrace to snooker." in reference to the News of the World allegations the previous year of match fixing, for which the heckler was later ejected from the venue. Higgins had only returned from a six month suspension due to the incident in November.

The final was played as the best of 35 frames, held over four sessions. The final was contested between Higgins and Trump, and officiated by Jan Verhaas, who was taking charge of his fourth World Championship final. Ted Lowe, BBC commentator for many years and the deviser of the long-running snooker programme Pot Black, died at the age of 90 on the morning of 1 May. Before the start of the final that day, a minute's applause in honour of Lowe took place. After the first session was tied at four frames all, Trump won the second session 6–3 to take a 10–7 lead into the second day's play. Higgins took a 13–12 lead after the third session of the final, which he won 6–2. Trump levelled the match at 14–14, before Higgins won four of the last five frames to win the match 18–15. 

This was Higgins 24th ranking title, and the fourth time he had won the event. Only Ray Reardon, Steve Davis and Hendry had won the event as many times. Higgins complemented Trump "He was the better player. He was playing a brand of snooker I have never seen before in my life." The pair would also contest the 2019 World Snooker Championship final, with Trump winning 18–9. The highest  of the tournament was 138 made by both King and Ding. This was the first time that the highest break of the tournament was lower than 140 since 1987, when it was 127 made by Davis.

Main draw
Below is the full draw for the main stage of the tournament. The numbers in brackets denote player seeding, whilst those in bold denote match winners. The draw for the first round took place on 21 March 2011, one day after the Players Tour Championship Finals.

Qualifying

Preliminary qualifying
The preliminary qualifying rounds for the tournament took place on 3 March 2011 at the World Snooker Academy in Sheffield.

Round 1

Round 2

Main qualifying
The qualifying rounds 1–4 for the tournament took place between 4 and 10 March 2011 at the World Snooker Academy in Sheffield. The final round of qualifying took place between 12 and 13 March 2011 at the same venue.

Round 1

Rounds 2–5

Century breaks

Televised stage centuries 
There were 74 century breaks in the televised stage of the World Championship.  

 138, 128, 121, 119, 117, 114, 102  Ding Junhui
 138  Mark King
 137, 125, 115, 113, 109, 106, 105, 104, 103  Mark Williams
 135, 132, 131, 124, 123, 121, 120, 113, 101  John Higgins
 134, 101  Stuart Bingham
 133, 117, 114  Stephen Hendry
 129, 127, 125, 124, 117, 108, 107, 100  Mark Selby
 128, 119, 116, 115, 113, 105, 100  Ronnie O'Sullivan
 127, 100  Neil Robertson
 123, 122, 110, 108, 105, 104, 104, 103, 102, 102  Judd Trump
 122, 120, 111, 102  Graeme Dott
 117  Barry Hawkins
 115, 112, 104  Ali Carter
 115, 100  Marco Fu
 114, 103, 102, 100  Mark Allen
 101  Stephen Lee
 100  Shaun Murphy

Qualifying stage centuries 
There were 73 century breaks in the qualifying stage of the World Championship. 

 141  James Wattana
 135, 108, 106, 100  Xiao Guodong
 133, 125, 124, 120, 103  Sam Baird
 132, 129, 118, 118, 115  Jamie Burnett
 130, 114  Kurt Maflin
 130  Rory McLeod
 129  David Gilbert
 129  Matthew Stevens
 127  Anthony McGill
 127  Liu Chuang
 127, 122  Ryan Day
 126, 114  Stuart Bingham
 124  Joe Swail
 124  Gerard Greene
 123, 113  Michael Holt
 123, 101, 100  Matthew Selt
 122  Ian McCulloch
 121  Jack Lisowski
 119, 115, 100, 100  Patrick Wallace
 117  Liu Song
 116  Andy Hicks
 113, 112, 107  Kuldesh Johal
 113, 112  David Gray
 112  Thanawat Thirapongpaiboon
 112  James McBain
 112  Tom Ford
 111  Jamie O'Neill
 111  Barry Pinches
 111  Jimmy Robertson
 109, 103  Paul Davison
 109, 102  Ken Doherty
 108  Stephen Rowlings
 108, 101  Dominic Dale
 107, 105  Michael White
 106, 100  Fergal O'Brien
 105, 101  Steve Davis
 105  Stephen Lee
 103  Anthony Hamilton
 102  Kyren Wilson
 101  Zhang Anda
 101  Mike Dunn
 101  Liang Wenbo
 100  Judd Trump

Notes

References

External links 

2011
World Championship
World Snooker Championship
Sports competitions in Sheffield
World Snooker Championship
World Snooker Championship